Sydney James Thompson (born 1912) was an Irish international lawn and indoor bowler. He played as Syd Thompson.

Bowls career
He served as the Northern Ireland Private Greens Bowling League (NIPGBL) President in 1974 and as Irish Bowling Association (IBA) and the British Isles Bowls Council (BIBC) President in 1964.

He won a bronze medal in the pairs at the 1970 Commonwealth Games in Edinburgh

He played 78 times for the Irish outdoor team and 51 times for the indoor team and was awarded an O.B.E.

He won the 1950 singles title and 1949 & 1957 pairs title at the Irish National Bowls Championships when bowling for the Willowfield Bowls Club.

References

1912 births
1998 deaths
Male lawn bowls players from Northern Ireland
Commonwealth Games medallists in lawn bowls
Commonwealth Games bronze medallists for Northern Ireland
Bowls players at the 1970 British Commonwealth Games
Medallists at the 1970 British Commonwealth Games